The United Kingdom of Great Britain and Northern Ireland has participated (under the name "Great Britain") in every summer and winter Paralympic Games.

While the Olympic Games find their origin in Greece, Britain, and specifically the Stoke Mandeville Hospital is recognised as the spiritual home of the Paralympic Games. The first Paralympic Games, held in Rome in 1960, were simultaneously the 9th International Stoke Mandeville Wheelchair Games, a competition first devised by Dr Ludwig Guttmann in 1948 to coincide with the London Olympic Games of 1948, for soldiers with spinal cord injuries being cared for in Stoke Mandeville Hospital. While the Stoke Mandeville Games continue to exist as the IWAS World Games, a specific event for wheelchair and amputee athletes, the Paralympic Games evolved from its Stoke Mandeville Games roots to include a comprehensive range of disabilities. This legacy is commemorated before each Paralympic Games since 2012 with the lighting of a 'legacy flame' at Stoke Mandeville as part of the Paralympic torch event.

Britain has performed particularly well at the Summer Paralympic Games, consistently finishing between second and fifth on the medal tables - a slightly better performance than at the Olympics reflecting Britain's long-time connection and support of the event. Britain has won two gold medals at the Winter Paralympics and 626 at the Summer Games.Due the historical performances,the british team is second on the all-time Paralympic Games medal table.

Britain was the one of the co-host countries of the 1984 Summer Paralympics in Stoke Mandeville, sharing the duties with New York, and the host of the 2012 Summer Paralympics, in London.

Although the country uses the name "Great Britain", athletes from Northern Ireland are entitled to compete as part of British delegations. Representatives of the devolved Northern Ireland government, however, have objected to the name, which they argue creates a perception that Northern Ireland is not part of the British Olympic team, and have called for the team to be renamed as Team UK.

Under the terms of a long-standing settlement between the British Paralympic Association and the Paralympics Ireland, athletes from Northern Ireland can elect to represent Ireland at the Paralympics, as Northern Irish people are legally entitled to dual citizenship.

Britain's most successful Paralympian is swimmer turned cyclist Sarah Storey, who took the honour at the 2020 Summer Paralympics when she won her 16th gold medal, and 27th medal in all. Prior to 2020, the record had been held for decades by swimmer Mike Kenny who also won 16 individual gold medals, as well as two relay silvers, in four Games. Although Great Britain has competed in every Games, the British Paralympic Committee was only founded in 1989, after Kenny's retirement. Media in Britain consistently referred to the most decorated Paralympic athletes from that year, Tanni Grey-Thompson, Dave Roberts and Sarah Storey as Britain's "greatest Paralympians", occasionally with the phrase "of the modern era", attached. The International Paralympic Committee, however, recognise all of Kenny's eighteen medals as Paralympic medals, and he remains Great Britain's most successful male Paralympian and the most successful British Paralympian in a single sport (Of her 16 gold medals, Storey won 11 in cycling and 5 in swimming).

Britain's first Paralympic gold was earned at the 1960 Rome Games by Margaret Maughan. Her feat was recognised when Maughan was chosen to light the Paralympic Flame during the Opening Ceremony of the 2012 Summer Paralympics.

Britain's first Winter Paralympic gold was earned at the Sochi 2014 Games by Kelly Gallagher and guide Charlotte Evans in the Women's Super-G Visually impaired.

Multiple athletes have won 4 medals at the Winter Paralympics for Great Britain, each in alpine skiing. Most recently by Menna Fitzpatrick and her guide Jennifer Kehoe in 2018, Jade Etherington and guide Caroline Powell in 2014. Richard Burt won 4 medals across two games in 1992 and 1994. However, Fitzpatrick and her guide Kehoe are the only athletes to have won a gold medal. The only other British athlete to have won a gold medal at the Winter Paralympics is Kelly Gallagher and her guide Charlotte Evans, also in alpine skiing in 2014.

Hosted Games 
In 2012, Great Britain became the second nation, the other being the United States, to host the Summer Paralympic Games twice.

Medal tables

*Red border colour indicates tournament was held on home soil.

Medals by Summer Games

Medals by Winter Games

Summer Games medals by sport

(Last updated: 5 September 2021)

Medals by Winter Sport 

Best results in non-medaling sports:

Multi medallists
Athletes in bold are still active

Summer Paralympics

Summer Paralympic multi medallists
Athletes who have won at least three gold medals or five medals.

Multi medals at single Games
This is a list of British athletes who have won at least two gold medals in a single Games. Ordered categorically by gold (then silver then bronze) medals earned, sports then year.

Multi medals at a single event
This is a list of British athletes who have won at least two gold medals in a single event at the Summer Paralympics. Ordered categorically by medals earned, sports then gold medals earned.

Most successful Paralympian in a sport
This is a list of British athletes who are the most successful Para-athletes in their sport at the Summer Paralympics. Ordered categorically by medals earned, sports then gold medals earned.

Most appearances
This is a list of British athletes who have competed in four or more Summer Paralympics. Active athletes are in bold. Athletes who were aged under 15 years of age and over 40 years of age are in bold.

Winter Paralympics

See also
 Great Britain at the Olympics

References